Drosera cuneifolia is a small rosette-forming species of perennial sundew native to the Cape in South Africa. It was first described in 1781.

Flowers individually open in the morning and close by mid afternoon, lasting just one day. The flowers can self-pollinate upon closing. The seeds are very small, black, spindle-shaped, and are released from the capsules that form when the flower has died.

During summer in South Africa, D. cuneifolia oversummers. It is found only near the Table mountain complex in South Africa.

External links 

Carnivorous plants of Africa
cuneifolia
Endemic flora of South Africa
Flora of the Cape Provinces
Fynbos
Natural history of Cape Town
Table Mountain